Gilloblennius is a genus of triplefins in the family Tripterygiidae. The genus is endemic to New Zealand.

Species
 Obscure triplefin, Gilloblennius abditus Hardy, 1986
 Thripenny, Gilloblennius tripennis (Forster, 1801)

References

 
Tripterygiidae